Dragoljub "Draža" Srnić (born 12 January 1992) is a Serbian footballer, playing for Radnički 1923. He is a twin brother of Slavoljub Srnić.

Club career

Red Star Belgrade
Born in Šabac, Srnić started his career with local football club Mačva. As a youth player, he had been sold to Red Star Belgrade, along with his twin brother Slavoljub. Passing the club categories, twins joined the first team in 2010, but Dragoljub failed to make any official senior appearance for the club. After they overgrown youth team, twins were loaned on dual registration to the Serbian League Belgrade side Sopot. Then both players moved on one-year loan deal to Čukarički. Twins sued the club, but later removed accusation and had been sold in 2013.

Čukarički
After the season which they spent as a loaned players with the club in the Serbian First League, Srnić brothers signed with Čukarički for an undisclosed fee in summer 2013. For the first two seasons as a regular club member, Dragoljub played 50 SuperLiga matches and scored 1 goal. He also noted 8 cup appearances, winning the competition for the 2014–15 season, and 4 caps in the 2014–15 UEFA Europa League qualifications. After his brother, Slavoljub, returned to Red Star Belgrade, Srnić scored both goals in 2–0 win over Radnik Surdulica in 9 fixture of the 2015–16 Serbian SuperLiga season, played on 11 September 2015. Playing with Čukarički, Srnić made 169 appearances with 6 goals in all competitions for five seasons with the club. He played mostly matches as a defensive midfielder, being elected for vice-captain behind the most experienced player in the team, and the club captain Igor Matić. After the contract expired, he left the club in summer 2017.

Śląsk Wrocław
On 4 July 2017, Srnić signed a two-year contract with the Polish Ekstraklasa side Śląsk Wrocław, with an option for a year extension. He made his debut for new club in 2–0 defeat against Arka Gdynia on 16 July 2017.

Career statistics

Club

Honours
Čukarički
Serbian Cup: 2014–15

References

External links
 Srnić Dragoljub stats at utakmica.rs 
 
 
 
 
 

1992 births
Living people
Sportspeople from Šabac
Association football midfielders
Serbian footballers
Red Star Belgrade footballers
FK Čukarički players
Śląsk Wrocław players
FK Sopot players
FK Voždovac players
ŁKS Łódź players
FK Radnički 1923 players
Ekstraklasa players
Serbian First League players
Serbian SuperLiga players
Serbian expatriate footballers
Serbian expatriate sportspeople in Poland
Expatriate footballers in Poland